In the Book of Mormon, Lamoni (believed to mean "Lamanite" or "of Laman") is a Lamanite king.  The missionary Ammon converts him back to the Law of Moses.  After this, Lamoni becomes righteous again.

Lamoni was a lesser king of part of the greater Lamanite Kingdom, as recounted in the Book of Mormon.  Lamoni's father was king over all of the Lamanites, a people who traditionally had a visceral hatred of the Nephites.  After initially having the Nephite missionary Ammon imprisoned, Lamoni later allows him to be his servant.  Later still Ammon saves some of Lamoni's servants and animals in a seemingly miraculous way.  Lamoni then believes that Ammon is the Great Spirit.  After being told by Ammon that he (Ammon) is only a servant of the Great Spirit (meant by context to mean God) Lamoni is finally convinced that Ammon is not deity.  After his conversion Lamoni is traveling with Ammon when he encounters his father the high Lamanite king.  At the peril of his life Lamoni verbally defends Ammon.  Eventually Lamoni helps gain freedom for Ammon and his fellow Nephite missionaries to preach freely in the Lamanite areas.  Lamoni's people are generally considered to be the corp of a people that would be called the Anti-Nephi-Lehies, or Ammonites

Town of Lamoni
Lamoni, Iowa, USA was named after the scriptural Lamoni, and was the headquarters of the Community of Christ (formerly the Reorganized Church of Jesus Christ of Latter Day Saints), a separate group from The Church of Jesus Christ of Latter-day Saints based in Salt Lake City, from 1880 to 1920. It was originally named New Buda by Hungarian immigrants, but in 1870, Joseph Smith III renamed the settlement "Lamoni" after him.

References

Book of Mormon people